Mmegi is an English-language national newspaper in Botswana, with occasional articles or comments in Setswana. Established in 1984, it is now published daily online and weekly on print format by Dikgang Publishing House in the capital, Gaborone. Mmegi used to be Botswana's only independent newspaper to be published daily.

The newspaper's name means "the reporter" in Setswana and its strapline is "News we need to know daily". Until 1989, it was called Mmegi wa Dikgang/The Reporter.

See also 
 Azhizhi
 The Voice Botswana
 Botswana Guardian
 The Botswana Gazette
 Yarona FM

References

External links

English-language newspapers published in Africa
Newspapers published in Gaborone
Publications established in 1984
1984 establishments in Botswana
Tswana-language mass media